State Route 200 (SR 200) is part of Maine's system of numbered state highways, located in Hancock County. The route runs from U.S. Route 1 (US 1) in Sullivan to SR 179 in Waltham.

Junction list

References

External links

Floodgap Roadgap's RoadsAroundME: Maine State Route 200

200
Transportation in Hancock County, Maine